Jae-hyun, also spelled Jae-hyeon, is a Korean unisex given name. Its meaning depends on the hanja used to write each syllable of the name. There are 20 hanja with the reading "jae" and 35 hanja with the reading "hyun" on the South Korean government's official list of hanja which may be registered for use in given names.

Entertainers
 Cho Jae-hyun (born 1965), South Korean actor
 Ahn Jae-hyun (born 1987), South Korean actor
 Kim Jae-hyun (born 1994), South Korean singer, member of rock band N.Flying
 Jaehyun (singer) (born Jeong Jae-hyun, 1997), South Korean singer, member of boy band NCT

Sportspeople
 Jo Jae-hyeon (cyclist) (born 1937), South Korean cyclist
 Park Jae-hyun (born 1980), South Korean football forward (Thai League 2)
 Kim Jae-hyeon (born Kim Eung-jin, 1987), South Korean football centre-back (K-League Challenge)
 Yong Jae-hyun (born 1988), South Korean football defender and midfielder (K-League Challenge)
 Choi Jae-hyeon (born 1994), South Korean football midfielder (K-League Classic)
 An Jae-hyun (born 1999), South Korean table tennis player
 Ko Jae-hyeon (born 1999), South Korean football midfielder (K-League 1)

Other
 Moon Jae-hyeon (born 1936), dharma name Daewon, South Korean Buddhist master
 Hyun Jae-hyun (born 1949), South Korean businessman, former chairman of the conglomerate Tongyang Group
 Lee Jay-hyun (born 1960), South Korean businessman, chairman of the CJ Group
 Jang Jae-hyun (born 1981), South Korean film director and screenwriter
 Choi Jae-hyun (born 1995), known as HuHi, South Korean League of Legends player

See also
List of Korean given names
Yi Jehyeon, Goryeo Dynasty neo-Confucian scholar

References

Korean masculine given names